Harlan Welbert Van Gerpen (June 18, 1924 – October 21, 2012) was an American politician who served in the Iowa House of Representatives from the 24th district from 1983 to 1985.

He died on October 21, 2012, in Cedar Falls, Iowa at age 88.

References

1924 births
2012 deaths
Republican Party members of the Iowa House of Representatives